The York Revolution is an American professional minor-league baseball team based in York, Pennsylvania. It is a member of the North Division of the Atlantic League of Professional Baseball, an independent "partner league" of Major League Baseball. The Revolution has played its home games at WellSpan Park, located in the Arch Street neighborhood, since 2007. The team has won the league championship three times, most recently over the Long Island Ducks on September 29, 2017.

Before the Revolution's inaugural season, baseball fans in York had waited 38 years for the return of the sport since the York White Roses folded after the 1969 season. In 2006, Yorkers chose the name "Revolution" in a team-sponsored fan ballot. The name originally referred to the city's colonial heritage, especially because the Continental Congress passed the Articles of Confederation in York during the Revolutionary War. At the time of the American Revolution, York was one of the first capitals of the United States. In 2012, the Revolution unveiled a new brand to emphasize York's more recent contributions to the Industrial Revolution with a secondary emphasis on patriotism. The region is home to industrial manufacturers such as Harley-Davidson, Stauffer's, and York International/Johnson Controls. Many Yorkers also see the Revolution name as a symbol of the city's renaissance efforts.

History of York baseball

York White Roses

The York White Roses, also known as the York Pirates in their last two seasons of existence, played from 1884 to 1969. The White Roses were bitter rivals of the Red Roses of the nearby city of Lancaster. Both teams were named after the two factions of England's historic Wars of the Roses.

Revolution
York tried for ten years to bring professional baseball back to the city. The process looked promising in 2003, until politics halted the project. The new baseball stadium was to be located at Small Athletic Field, on York City School District property, but the district's board voted negatively as they did not believe the ballpark would be the best use of district money and land. For three years, political and financial discussions continued to delay the project. A new site for the stadium was agreed upon in the Arch Street neighborhood, with all of the pieces falling into place. Other sites that were considered but did not come to fruition were Hoffman Field and the Ohio Blenders of PA, Inc.

In April 2006, the Atlantic League of Professional Baseball formally announced an expansion team for the city of York. One of the prominent members of the team's ownership group is Brooks Robinson, who played with the York White Roses and later with the Baltimore Orioles from 1955 to 1977. A statue of Robinson was erected in the area outside the stadium entrance and called Brooks Robinson Plaza in his honor.

The Revolution's inaugural season saw the team finish third in the South Division with a record of 58–68. Their fortunes changed quickly, however, with 2008 bringing a first-place finish in the newly named Freedom Division and the franchise's first trip to the playoffs. The Revs were ousted early in the 2008 playoffs, but were back in 2010 when they won the Atlantic League championship, the first professional baseball title the city had won since the 1969 York Pirates of the Eastern League. The Revs took home the trophy again in 2011, winning back-to-back championships and becoming just the second team in league history to accomplish the feat. They returned to the playoffs for a third straight season in 2012, but lost in the opening round.

In the 2009 preseason, the Revolution joined the two other Atlantic League teams in holding their spring training at home instead of the traditional site in Lakeland, Florida. The respective ownership groups of the three teams came to this decision so as to cut costs, citing the 2008 economic recession.

On March 24, 2014, the Revolution became the first professional baseball team to accept Bitcoins as a form of payment for ticket purchases.

All-Star Games
The Revolution hosted the 2011 Atlantic League All-Star Game at WellSpan Park on July 14, 2011. They had seven players named to the All-Star team in addition to manager Andy Etchenbarren, who skippered the Freedom Division. In front of a sellout crowd, two of those Revolution players, Corey Thurman and Val Majewski, helped to lead the Freedom Division to a 7–0 shutout over the Liberty Division. Thurman started the game, throwing two shutout innings and Majewski hit a solo homerun over the right field wall to start the scoring. Michael Hernandez of the Somerset Patriots ended up taking home the game's MVP award with a solo blast of his own and an RBI triple in the seventh inning. Prior to the game, Val Majewski participated in the homerun derby and was a member of the winning team. The first pitch of the All-Star Game was thrown out by former Dover High School football player and then Green Bay Packer John Kuhn.

The Revolution again hosted the Atlantic League All-Star Game at WellSpan Park in July 2019.

Logos and uniforms

From 2007 to 2010, the York Revolution's colors were navy blue, red, white, brass, and silver. The original brand focused exclusively on symbols such as the United States flag and the bald eagle. The team re-branded for the 2011 season to the look used today.

The current team colors of the York Revolution are navy blue, yellow, white, and silver. The "Revolution" wordmark is colored white in an industrial script centered on a navy blue background. The word "York" is featured above in white with a baseball standing in for the letter "O". The entire wordmark is outlined in silver. Centered above the wordmark is a bald eagle holding a baseball bat.

The York Revolution wear caps produced by OC Sports and uniforms by New Balance. The caps are navy blue throughout with a stylized white "Y" topped with an eagle's head clutching a baseball. The entire cap logo is outlined in silver. The Revolution wordmark is centered on the back, lower edge of the cap. There is also an all yellow hat featuring the York "Y" being grasped by an eagle talon.

The home jerseys are white with navy blue and yellow paneling down the sides. They feature a navy blue cursive serif wordmark with a yellow outline that pays tribute to the Baltimore Orioles' script. The away jersey is gray with navy blue and yellow paneling down the sides. Across the chest is the cursive "York" wordmark in navy blue outlined in yellow with a traditional underscore. The team also sports a third alternate jersey, which has changed numerous times over the years.

Season-by-season records

Tradition

War of the Roses

Philanthropy
In 2013, the team started the York Revolution Community Fund through the York County Community Foundation. The team raises funds through jersey auctions, memorabilia sales, 50/50 raffles, and the sale of other items like the Revs Kitchen cookbook, which sees Revolution players, coaches, and staff sharing their favorite recipes. The money raised by the fund is then given back to the community in the form of grants to local non-profit groups who provide services directly to York County.

The Revolution benefit the Big Brothers Big Sisters youth mentoring organization annually by wearing purple jerseys that are auctioned off immediately following the Purple Jersey Night game. Additionally, the team also partnered with Columbia Gas to donate $50 to the York Red Cross for each run scored by a Revolution player.

Radio
The official broadcast home of the York Revolution is WOYK 1350 AM, with Darrell Henry as the "Voice of the Revolution". Prior to the 2010 season, games were heard on WSBA 910 AM.

Television
While Revolution games are not broadcast via a traditional television network, each game was streamed live via a "York Revs TV" YouTube Channel through 2018, and beginning in 2019 via the WOYK YouTube channel.

On-field entertainment

Mascots
The York Revolution's official mascot is an anthropomorphic, blue creature named DownTown. He wears the team's home jersey, the primary cap worn backwards, with blue and white sneakers. DownTown debuted on March 31, 2007, at the Mascot: The Musical production at the DreamWrights Theater. His full name is DownTown Yorkie, and is the result of a sponsorship deal with Downtown Inc, a partnership of community-minded companies that work to improve and celebrate downtown York. Downtown wears a jersey with the number "00". The mascot was designed by the Raymond Entertainment Group, which also produced the Phillie Phanatic's costume.

DownTown has a cousin named SmallTown, who will occasionally turn up at games. He debuted in 2009 and wears the number "". A kid wears the costume and follows DownTown for a day.

The Revolution also host a character named Cannonball Charlie, who fires a cannon after each home run or home game victory by the team. He wears the uniform of a period Continental Army soldier.

Single season records

Offensive
Hits: 172.....James Shanks, 2010
Doubles: 38.....Andres Perez, 2013
Triples: 17.....Eric Patterson, 2014
Homeruns: 34.....Chris Nowak, 2012
RBIs: 107.....Chris Nowak, 2012
Walks: 84.....Scott Grimes, 2010
Stolen bases: 55.....Wilson Valdez, 2014

Pitching
Wins: 15.....Chris Cody, 2013
Strikeouts: 139.....Chris Cody, 2013
Saves: 35.....Mike DeMark, 2016

Atlantic League All-Stars
The following players were named to the Atlantic League All-Star team in each particular season. An asterisk (*) indicates the player participated in the home run derby.

2007

 Chris Cooper (LHP)
 Matt Dryer (INF)
 Nate Espy* (INF)
 Chris Steinborn (LHP)
 Luis Taveras (C)

2008

 Sandy Aracena (C)
 Jason Aspito (OF)
 Nick McCurdy (RHP)
 Jason Olson (RHP)

2009

 Tom Collaro (DH)
 Keoni DeRenne (INF)
 Chris Hoiles (MGR)
 Jason Kershner (LHP)
 Corey Thurman (RHP)

2010

 Ian Bladergroen* (1B)
 Ramon Castro (SS)
 Scott Grimes (CF)
 Derell McCall (RHP)
 John Pachot (C)
 Jesus Sanchez (LHP)
 James Shanks (LF)

2011

 Matt DeSalvo (RHP)
 Andy Etchenbarren (MGR)
 Eric Eymann (SS)
 Vince Harrison (3B)
 Val Majewski* (CF)
 Octavio Martinez (C)
 James Shanks (LF)
 Corey Thurman (RHP)

2012

 Andy Etchenbarren (MGR)
 Brandon Haveman (CF)
 Michael Hernandez (DH)
 Andrew Perez (2B)
 Adam Thomas (RHP)
 Corey Thurman (RHP)

2013

 Chris Cody (LHP)
 Salvador Paniagua (C)
 Eric Patterson (SS)
 Andres Perez (2B)
 Michael Wuertz (RHP)

2014

 Rommie Lewis (LHP)
 Johan Limonta (INF/OF)
 Eric Patterson (2B)
 Wilson Valdez (SS)

2015

 Brandon Boggs (OF)
 Luis De La Cruz (C)
 Stephen Penney (RHP)
 Andres Perez (INF)
 Bryan Pounds (INF)
 Logan Williamson (LHP)

2016

 Mike DeMark (P)
 Ricardo Gomez (P)
 Joel Guzman (DH)
 Andres Perez (INF)
 Travis Witherspoon (OF)

2017

 Brad Allen (RHP)
 Michael Burgess (INF)
 Alonzo Harris (OF)
 Chase Huchingson (LHP)
 Isaias Tejeda (C)
 Travis Witherspoon (OF)

2018

 Mitch Atkins (RHP)
 Robert Carson (LHP)
 Welington Dotel (OF)
 Jared Mitchell (OF)
 Grant Sides (RHP)

2019

 Mitch Atkins (RHP)
 Henry Castillo (OF)
 Ryan Dent (INF)
 Welington Dotel (OF)
 Jameson McGrane (RHP)
 Telvin Nash (INF)
 James Skelton (C)
 Isaias Tejeda (OF)

2020
Season canceled due to the COVID-19 pandemic

Atlantic League/national awards
Player of the Year
 Scott Grimes, 2010 (co)

Manager of the Year
 Andy Etchenbarren, 2011
 Mark Mason, 2014

Baseball America All-Independent Team
 Scott Grimes (OF), 2010
 Chris Nowak (DH), 2011
 Ramon Castro (2B), 2011
 Chris Nowak (1B), 2012
 Andres Perez (2B), 2012

Notable alumni
These are some of the notable players who made it to the majors after playing in York. The years in parentheses indicate when they were with the Revs.
 Tike Redman (2007)
 Scott Rice (2011)
 Ian Thomas (2012)
Bubby Rossman (2021)

Retired numbers
 5 – Brooks Robinson
 Robinson began his professional baseball career in York, playing 95 games for the White Roses in 1955. He had a successful 23-year career in MLB, all spent with the Baltimore Orioles. He was inducted into the National Baseball Hall of Fame in 1983 and is a member of the Revolution's ownership group.
 8 – Andy Etchebarren
 "Etch" spent 15 years in MLB, 12 of them with the Baltimore Orioles. He managed the Revolution for four seasons (2009–2012), compiling 237 wins and guiding the team to three straight playoff appearances, including back-to-back Atlantic League championships. He retired from baseball at the end of the 2012 season.
 35 – Corey Thurman
 Thurman spent eight seasons in the Atlantic League, all with the Revolution. He is the franchise's all-time leader in wins (66), strikeouts (667), and innings pitched while ranking second in Atlantic League history in the same categories. He was a three-time All-Star and two-time Atlantic League champion.
 42 – Jackie Robinson
 Robinson was the first African-American to play in MLB when he started for the Brooklyn Dodgers in 1947. He spent his entire 10-year career in Brooklyn and was inducted into the National Baseball Hall of Fame in 1962. His number was retired throughout professional baseball on April 15, 1997.

Current roster

References

External links
 York Revolution official website

 
Sports in York, Pennsylvania
Professional baseball teams in Pennsylvania
Atlantic League of Professional Baseball teams
Opening Day Partners
Baseball teams established in 2006
2006 establishments in Pennsylvania